William Marc Malnati (born April 28, 1985) is an American restaurateur, producer, actor and entrepreneur.

Early life
Will Malnati is originally from Northbrook, Illinois. He attended New Trier High School and Cornell University. Malnati grew up in a family of restaurateurs: the grandson of Lou Malnati, founder of Lou Malnati's Pizzeria, and son of current Lou Malnati's owner Marc Malnati. Will Malnati started his creative career at production company LivePlanet.

Career

Hospitality
Following his graduation from the School of Hotel Administration at Cornell University in 2007, Malnati managed restaurants and nightlife establishments in Chicago and New York. In 2013, Malnati partnered with Ken Oringer, Jamie Bissonnette, and Doug Jacob to open a Chelsea, New York location of Boston's Spanish tapas restaurant Toro. The three went on to open Toro outposts in Bangkok and Dubai. Malnati has since left the hospitality business.

At Will Media
In 2016, Malnati founded At Will Media, a production company for podcasts and other digital content. The company develops and produces original podcasts such as Sorry Charlie Miller in partnership with Audible; Wild Things: Siegfried & Roy, a multi-part nonfiction podcast about the legendary magicians for AppleTV+; and Breakthrough, a singing competition developed exclusively as a podcast for Audible. Malnati presented Wild Things at the Tribeca Film Festival in 2021. The company also produces and curates podcasts for high-profile corporations.

Malnati also hosted his own podcast, The Drop-In, in 2016 and 2017. Each episode features a candid conversation with an interesting person in popular culture or leader in entertainment, hospitality and business. Guests have included Chris Hardwick, Sebastian Stan, and Nico Tortorella.

Awards and honors
In 2013, Malnati was named to the Zagat's "30 Under 30" list as an owner of the Chelsea-based American nouveau restaurant Willow Road, and in 2015 was also named to Forbes' "30 Under 30" as a managing partner at Toro.

References

1985 births
American restaurateurs
American consulting businesspeople
Living people
Cornell University School of Hotel Administration alumni